Ridge Boulevard Apartments is a historic apartment building at the southeast corner of Ridge Avenue and Main Street in Evanston, Illinois. The three-story brick building was built in 1913. Owner Thomas McCall, who was also an architect, designed the building. McCall's design included miter arched entrances, bay windows, stone banding, and a rear courtyard. The twenty-one apartments in the building featured amenities such as sun porches, servants' rooms, and fireplaces in the larger units.

The building was added to the National Register of Historic Places on March 15, 1984.

References

Buildings and structures on the National Register of Historic Places in Cook County, Illinois
Residential buildings on the National Register of Historic Places in Illinois
Buildings and structures in Evanston, Illinois
Apartment buildings in Illinois
Residential buildings completed in 1913